Elattoneura tetrica, black and yellow bambootail is a damselfly species in the family Platycnemididae. It is endemic to Western Ghats in India.

Description and habitat
It is a medium sized damselfly with black-capped pale blue eyes beneath, marked with a black equatorial belt. Its thorax is metallic velvet-black on dorsum. The anterior border of mesepimeron and the lower part of sides are creamy white, separated with a broad stripe in black. The lower part may get pruinosed. Its abdomen is black, pruinosed on the basal segments in adults. Segments 3 to 6 have thin baso-dorsal bluish-white annules. Anal appendages are black.

Female is similar to the male; but paler eyes and dull colored thotax. Teneral males look like the female in colour and markings; adult lose almost all their markings due to pruinescence.

It is closely associated with submontane streams and lakes where it breeds.

See also 
 List of odonates of India
 List of odonata of Kerala

References

External links

Platycnemididae
Insects of India
Insects described in 1917